The women's sprint event in cycling at the 2004 Summer Olympics consisted of a series of head-to-head matches in which cyclists made three laps around the track. Only the time for the last 200 metres of the 750 metres covered was counted as official time.

Medalists

Records

Qualifying round
Each cyclist covered the course individually in the qualifying round.  The times were used to seed the twelve riders for the 1/8 finals.

1/8 final
The twelve cyclists competed in six matches of two cyclists each.  Winners advanced to the quarterfinals while the defeated riders received a second chance in the 1/8 repechage.

1/8 repechage
The 1/8 repechage consisted of two heats of three cyclists, with the six riders that had been defeated in the 1/8 final competing.  The winner of each of the heats returned to the main competition and advanced to the quarterfinal.  The losers of the repechage competed in the 9th to 12th place classification.

Classification 9-12
The 9-12 classification was one race in which all four losers from the 1/8 repechage competed.  The winner of the classification took 9th place, with the following three places going to the other cyclists in order.

Quarterfinals
The quarterfinals pitted the eight cyclists against each other in four pairwise matches.  Each match was a best-of-three race competition.  Winners advanced to the semifinals while the losers competed in the 5th to 8th place classification.

Classification 5-8
The 5-8 classification was one race in which all four losers from the quarterfinals competed.  The winner of the classification took 5th place, with the following three places going to the other cyclists in order.

Semifinals
The semifinals were again best-of-three matches.  Winners advanced to the final, while losers competed for the bronze medal.

Bronze medal match
The bronze medal match was best-of-three.

Final
The final was a best-of-three match; Muenzer won the first two races to eliminate the need for a third.

Final classification
The final classification was

References

External links
Official Olympic Report

W
Track cycling at the 2004 Summer Olympics
Cycling at the Summer Olympics – Women's sprint
Olymp
Women's events at the 2004 Summer Olympics